is a Japanese voice actor.

Filmography

Television animation
Code Geass: Lelouch of the Rebellion (2006) - Pilot (ep 8); Staff (ep 7)
Deltora Quest(2007) - Li-nan
Code Geass: Lelouch of the Rebellion R2 (2008) - Kanon Maldini
Attack on Titan (2013) – Gunther Schultz
Attack on Titan: Junior High (2015) – Gunther Schultz
Wonder Egg Priority (2021) – Kendo Club Advisor (ep 10)

Unknown date
Gunslinger Girl -Il Teatrino- as Giuseppe
Immortal Grand Prix as Takeshi Jinno
Inazuma Eleven GO as Hyoudou Tsukasa
Initial D: Fourth Stage as Male B (Ep 1)
Mermaid Forest as Shiina
Mobile Suit Gundam Seed as Al Da Flaga (ep 45); Ray Yuki (ep 35,50)
Mobile Suit Gundam Seed Special Edition as Ray Yuki
Planetes as Black Clothes (ep 20); Cadet C (ep 21); Classmate (ep 13); Company Employee (ep 22); Controller (ep 23); Coworker (ep 10); Debris Dumper B (ep 9); Deputy Commander B (ep 12); Devon; Hotel Man (ep 6); Male A (ep 7); Male Fan (ep 19); Pilot (ep 18); Reporter (ep 25); Researcher (ep 11)
Pokémon Mystery Dungeon: Team Go-Getters Out Of The Gate! as Madatsubomi
Rumiko Takahashi Anthology as employee (ep 2); male subordinate (ep 9); mover (ep 13); Risa's son (ep 7)
Wangan Midnight as RGO Yamanaka
Yomigaeru Sora – Rescue Wings as Kengo Mochizuki (ep 10,11)

Films
Doraemon: Nobita in the Wan-Nyan Spacetime Odyssey (2004) – Officer
Paprika (2006) – Pierrot
Jungle Emperor Leo: The Brave Change The Future (2009) – Hunters
Code Geass: Lelouch of the Re;surrection (2019) – Kanon Maldini

Original net animation
The King of Fighters: Destiny (2017) – Joe Higashi
Ninjala (2020) – Lucy's Dad

Video games
Tokyo Mirage Sessions ♯FE (2015) – Cord
The King of Fighters XIV (2016) – Joe Higashi
The King of Fighters All Star (2018) – Joe Higashi
Tales of Arise (2021) – Grenar, Hevrekt-35
The King of Fighters XV (2022) – Joe Higashi

References

External links
 
Kouzou Mito at the Dojinsha Production (Japanese)

1979 births
Living people
Japanese male video game actors
Japanese male voice actors
Male voice actors from Yamaguchi Prefecture
21st-century Japanese male actors